Shock Patrol is a 1957 French war film set during the First Indochina War that was written and directed by Claude Ogrel under the name Claude Bernard-Aubert Ogrel was a war correspondent in French Indochina from 1949 to 1954 and this was his film debut. The film was the first French film about the First Indochina War. The original title Patrol Without Hope (Patrouille sans espoir)  was changed along with the original pessimistic ending.

Plot
During the Indochina War in the late 1940s, Lieutenant Perrin is in charge of a small battalion of French troops at a remote outpost in Vietnam.

The soldiers are on the best of terms with the locals and provide them with both education and essential medical supplies. In return, the grateful villagers keep an eye out for any sign of a possible attack by the Viet Minh. For a while, the region enjoys an almost unreal tranquillity. The soldiers are glad of the peace but boredom soon sets in amid expectations of an impending assault. When the peace ends, it ends with a brutal suddenness.

One night, the Vietnamese insurrectionists converge on the garrison and launch a fierce, all-out attack. Such are the scale and ferocity of the onslaught that Perrin and his men are caught completely off-guard and can only put up a token resistance. The French soldiers are vastly out-numbered by their Viet Minh attackers, and the grim outcome is all too certain.

Starring
Alain Bouvette ... French soldier
Jean-Claude Michel ... French soldier
Jean Pontoizeau ... French soldier
Hoàng Vĩnh Lộc ... Vietnamese soldier

References

Further reading

Documents
Lê Quang Thanh Tâm, Điện ảnh miền Nam trôi theo dòng lịch sử, Hochiminh City Culture & Arts Publishing House, Saigon, 2015
Phạm Công Luận, Hồi ức, sưu khảo, ghi chép về văn hóa Sài Gòn, Phuongnam Books & Thegioi Publishing House, Saigon, 2016–2022

External links

Shock Patrol at Films de France | http://filmsdefrance.com/FDF_Patrouille_de_choc_1957_rev.html

1950s French-language films
French war films
First Indochina War films
French black-and-white films
1957 directorial debut films
1957 war films
1957 films
1950s French films